The 2013 ASP World Tour is a professional competitive surfing league run by the Association of Surfing Professionals. Men and women compete in separate tours with events taking place from late February to mid-December, at various surfing locations around the world.

Surfers receive points for their best events. The surfer with the most points at the end of the tour is announced the ASP World Tour Champion.

For the 2013 season, the champions were Mick Fanning (men) and Carissa Moore (women).

ASP World Championship Tour

Schedule

Source

Final 2013 Standings
Source:2013 Men's World Championship Tour

ASP Women’s World Championship Tour

Event Schedule

[1] Roxy Pro was originally scheduled for July 10–14 in Biarritz, but due to poor surf it was cancelled.  The event was rescheduled for September in Hossegor in conjunction with the Men's event 
Source

Final standings
Source

References

External links
 Official Site

World Surf League
ASP World Tour